Ballads from the Revolution is the third album by the Santa Cruz, California-based hardcore punk band Good Riddance, released February 10, 1998 through Fat Wreck Chords.

The original release contained I Stole Your Love titled I.S.Y.L. and this particular track was not made available to modern streaming services.

Reception 
Andy Hinds of Allmusic rated Ballads from the Revolution four and a half stars out of five, remarking that Good Riddance "play harder, louder and faster — the tunes detonate, one after another, like a volley of mortar fire. Still, the band know how to incorporate pure pop sweetness into their relentless assault without ever coming close to cheesiness".

Track listing

Personnel 
 Russ Rankin – vocals
 Luke Pabich – guitar
 Chuck Platt – bass guitar
 Sean Sellers – drums
 Ryan Greene – producer, recording engineer, mix engineer
 Adam Krammer – assistant engineer

References

External links 
 Ballads from the Revolution at Fat Wreck Chords

1998 albums
Good Riddance (band) albums
Fat Wreck Chords albums
Albums produced by Ryan Greene